Hrayr Shahinian, M.D., F.A.C.S. is an American skull base surgeon and founder of the Skull Base Institute (SBI).  He was Board Certified by the American Board of Surgery and was licensed to practice in California since 1996. On August 11, 2016, the Medical Board of California, Department of Consumer Affairs, State of California adopted the decision to revoke the Physician and Surgeon's Certificate issued to Hrayr Karnig Shahinian, M.D. The order came into effect on September 9, 2016.

References

American neurosurgeons
American people of Armenian descent
University of Chicago alumni
Vanderbilt University alumni
Living people
Year of birth missing (living people)